Let the Music Do the Talking is the first of three studio albums by The Joe Perry Project, released in 1980. It was the band's most successful, selling approximately 250,000 copies in the United States. The title track was later re-recorded in by Aerosmith on their 1985 reunion album Done With Mirrors, albeit with a slightly different melody and Steven Tyler-penned lyrics.

Background
Fed up with the slow pace of the recording of Night in the Ruts and frustrated with the band's precarious financial situation, Perry left Aerosmith in the spring of 1979. He recruited Aerosmith's former producer Jack Douglas and chose Ralph Morman for lead singer, who Perry had previously heard performing in a band called Daddy Warbux. The group was rounded out by bassist David Hull and drummer Ronnie Stewart. "The contrast between the tortuous ordeal of recording Aerosmith and the seamless groove that characterized the Project was remarkable," Perry later recalled.

Recording and composition
Considering Aerosmith's struggles, Columbia Records was initially hesitant to give Perry a solo deal, but he assured them he could turn in an album in "five or six weeks." In his 2014 autobiography Rocks, the guitarist states that the songs were largely autobiographical:

Reception

Let the Music Do the Talking received generally favorable reviews from critics. Greg Prato of AllMusic wrote that "maybe because he wanted to show his former band mates that he could succeed without them, the performances were extremely inspired, while the songwriting was sharp and focused... A truly great and underrated record, Let the Music Do the Talking could have been a classic Aerosmith release if the drugs hadn't split the band apart." Canadian journalist Martin Popoff remarked how in comparison with Aerosmth albums Let the Music Do the Talking has "a greater emphasis on both control and funkiness, yet still exuding tons of warmth and larger-than-life riffery", and praised Perry for his "eccentric, concentric interpretations of the blues."

Let the Music Do the Talking proved to be The Joe Perry Project's highest charting album, peaking at #47 on Billboard.

Track listing

Personnel
The Joe Perry Project
Ralph Morman – vocals
Joe Perry – guitars, lead vocals on tracks 2, 4, 7 and 9, backing vocals, bass synthesizer on track 1, percussion, producer, cover concept
David Hull – bass guitar, bass synthesizer on track 8, backing vocals
Ronnie Stewart – drums, percussion

 Additional musicians
Rocky Donahue – percussion

Production
Jack Douglas – percussion, producer, mixing at The Record Plant, New York
Lee DiCarlo – engineer, mixing
Chris Tergesen, Julie Last – assistant engineers
Greg Calbi – mastering at Sterling Sound, New York
John Berg – cover concept
Jerry Abramowitz, Ron Pownall – photography
David Krebs, Steve Leber – management

References

1980 debut albums
The Joe Perry Project albums
Albums produced by Jack Douglas (record producer)
Columbia Records albums